The Reformers (Les Réformateurs) is a libertarian and liberal faction within The Republicans, formerly called the Union for a Popular Movement (UMP).

The Reformers supported laissez-faire and a free market economy. It is led by Hervé Novelli and most members of it come from Liberal Democracy, a right-liberal party which merged into the UMP in 2002. Many of its members are also close supporters of Nicolas Sarkozy within the party.

Members

 Philippe Auberger
 Jean Auclair
 Jean-Claude Beaulieu
 Marc Bernier
 René Bouin
 Loïc Bouvard
 Philippe Briand
 Jacques Briat
 Bernard Brochand
 Chantal Brunel
 Dominique Caillaud
 François Calvet
 Bernard Carayon
 Olivier Carré
 Luc Chatel
 Gérard Cherpion
 Jean-Louis Christ
 Philippe Cochet
 Édouard Courtial
 Paul-Henri Cugnenc
 Olivier Dassault
 Bernard Deflesselles
 Lucien Degauchy
 Francis Delattre
 Jean-Jacques Descamps
 Patrick Devedjian
 Jacques Domergue
 Jean-Pierre Door
 Gérard Dubrac
 Yannick Favennec
 Daniel Fidelin
 Jean-Michel Fourgous
 Claude Gatignol
 Bruno Gilles
 Maurice Giro
 Louis Giscard d'Estaing
 Claude Goasguen
 François-Michel Gonnot
 Jean-Pierre Gorges 
 François Goulard
 Claude Greff
 Arlette Grosskost
 Louis Guédon
 Jean-Jacques Guillet
 Sébastien Huyghe
 Édouard Jacque
 Aimé Kergueris
 Pierre Lang
 Marc Le Fur
 Pierre Lellouche
 Jean-Claude Lenoir
 Jean-Louis Léonard
 Lionnel Luca
 Daniel Mach
 Alain Madelin
 Richard Mallié
 Hervé Mariton
 Fernand Siré
 Christian Vanneste
 Philippe Vitel
 Gérard Longuet 
 Hervé Novelli 

Alain Madelin, the leader of Liberal Democracy and former deputy, was also a notable member of the club. Jean-Pierre Gorges left the club in 2006.

External links
Official website

Political party factions in France
Factions and associate parties of the Union for a Popular Movement
Libertarianism in France
Libertarian parties